Thorgaut or Turgot (c. 1050–1115) (sometimes, Thurgot) was Archdeacon and Prior of Durham, and Bishop of Saint Andrews.

Turgot came from the Kingdom of Lindsey in Lincolnshire. After the Norman conquest he was held as a hostage, but escaped to Norway, where he taught king Olaf psalmody. In about 1074 he returned to England and became a clerk at Jarrow monastery. He then became a monk at Wearmouth, and in 1087 he was appointed prior of the monastery at Durham, from 1093 combining this with the archdeaconry of Durham. He became close to the Scottish court, and between 1100 and 1107 he wrote the life of Malcolm's wife, Saint Margaret of Scotland, at the request of her daughter, Matilda, wife of king Henry I of England.

In 1093, he and Bishop William de St-Calais laid the foundation stone for what would later become Durham Cathedral.

In 1107, the Prior was elected bishop of St Andrews. Consecration was delayed by ecclesiastical disputes between York and St Andrews, and did not take place until 1 August 1109. According to Symeon of Durham, he found that he could not exercise the office "worthily", and resolved to go to Rome, but he was prevented by the king. He then became ill and was allowed to return to Durham, where he died on 31 August 1115.

Notes

Further reading
Dowden, John, The Bishops of Scotland, ed. J. Maitland Thomson, (Glasgow, 1912), pp. 1–3
Dawson, Christopher, "Religion and the Rise of Western Culture", (Doubleday, 1950), pp. 100
Veitch, Kenneth, "Replanting Paradise: Alexander I and the Reform of Religious Life in Scotland", in The Innes Review, 52, (Autumn, 2001), pp. 136–166

1050s births
1115 deaths
11th-century Scottish Roman Catholic bishops
12th-century Scottish Roman Catholic bishops
Bishops of St Andrews
Priors of Durham
Benedictine priors
12th-century Scottish writers
Medieval Scottish writers